Adu Garhi is a town in the Federally Administered Tribal Areas of Pakistan. It is located at 33°36'18N 70°55'42E with an altitude of 1175 metres (3858 feet).

References

Populated places in Khyber Pakhtunkhwa